Grobnik may refer to:
 , Croatia, a village near Čavle and Rijeka, Croatia
 , a fortification in the village
 Grobnik Field, site of the legendary Battle of Grobnik Field
 Automotodrom Grobnik, a motorsport race track in the same field
 Grobnik, Istria County, a village near Pićan, Croatia
 Grobnik, Karlovac County, a village near Slunj, Croatia
 Slats Grobnik, fictional columnist contributor